Jeju Loveland (also known as Love Land) is an outdoor sculpture park which opened in 2004 on Jeju Island in South Korea. The park is focused on a theme of sex, running sex education films, and featuring 140 sculptures representing humans in various sexual positions. It also has other elements such as large phallus statues, stone labia, and hands-on exhibits such as a "masturbation-cycle". The park's website describes the location as "a place where love oriented art and eroticism meet".

Background
During the 1970s, Jeju Island became a popular honeymoon destination for Korean couples, due to the island's warm climate and Cold War-era restrictions on overseas travel. Many of the couples had wed because of arranged marriages, and the island also became known for being a center of sex education. According to an article in Germany's Der Spiegel magazine, in the late 1980s journalist and travel writer Simon Winchester reported that some hotel employees on the island performed as "professional icebreakers". In the evenings, the hotel would offer an entertainment program featuring erotic elements, to help newlyweds relax.

In 2002, graduates of Seoul's Hongik University began creating sculptures for the park, which opened on November 16, 2004. Encompassing an area the size of "two soccer fields", all of the sculptures can be viewed in approximately one hour, and there is an additional monthly rotating exhibit featuring works by different Korean artists.

Visitors are required to be at least 18 years old, and a separate play area is available for minors while adults visit. The play area is themed on anime.

See also
Haesindang Park
Love Land (China)
Chao Mae Tuptim
Sex museum

References
English-language version of official website (also available in Korean, Japanese, and Chinese)
  "A Phallus Garden in 'Love Land'", August 11, 2006, Der Spiegel

External links

 Photo gallery
 Satellite view of park

Parks in Jeju Province
Sex museums
Sexuality in South Korea
2004 establishments in South Korea
Sculpture gardens, trails and parks in Asia
Erotic art